The Sound of Jo Jo Zep & The Falcons is the first greatest hits album by Australian Blues, rock and R&B band, Jo Jo Zep & The Falcons.

Track listing

Charts

Release history

References

1983 greatest hits albums
Mushroom Records albums
Jo Jo Zep & The Falcons albums
Compilation albums by Australian artists